Telesforo Castillejos (born 5 January 1947, Basco, Batanes, Philippines) is a Filipino politician and former Governor of the province of Batanes, Philippines. On September 3, 2008, he was injured in an ambush in Pasay while being driven home.

References

Living people
1947 births
Governors of Batanes
Lakas–CMD (1991) politicians
People from Batanes
United Nationalist Alliance politicians
Lakas–CMD politicians
Independent politicians in the Philippines